Butrimonys is a small town in Alytus County in southern Lithuania. In 2011 it had a population of 941.

Butrimonys massacre

On 9 September 1941, shortly after the Nazi invasion of the Soviet Union, the Jews of Butrimonys were massacred by Einsatzgruppen and Lithuanian collaborators. Rounded up and marched along a road, they were lined up beside a mass grave and machine-gunned. According to the Jäger Report, 740 Jews were murdered in one day: 67 men, 370 women, and 303 children.

What distinguished Butrimonys from hundreds of similar crimes in the Baltic region was the survival of a detailed record left by a local Jew Khone Boyarski. Hiding with his son, Boyarski described the events in a farewell letter to his relatives abroad. Boyarski was later killed by the Nazis; the letter was discovered by accident by a graduate student in the archives of Yad Vashem.

Famous people
 Bernard Berenson (1865–1959), a famous and still influential American art historian
 Senda Berenson (1868–1954), known as the Mother of Women's Basketball. Berenson introduced basketball to women in 1892 at Smith College in Northampton, Massachusetts, United States, a year after being first invented by James Naismith. She also authored the  first Basketball Guide for Women (1901–07).

References

External links

Alytus District Municipality
Towns in Lithuania
Towns in Alytus County
Troksky Uyezd
Holocaust locations in Lithuania